"Borrow My Heart" is the debut single by season five runner-up of The X Factor Australia, Taylor Henderson. It was released digitally by Sony Music Australia on 1 November 2013, as the lead single from his self-titled debut album. "Borrow My Heart" debuted at number one on the ARIA Singles Chart and was certified two times platinum by the Australian Recording Industry Association for selling over 140,000 copies.

Background and release
"Borrow My Heart" was written by Louis Schoorl, Hayley Warner and Alex Hope, and produced by Schoorl. It would have been Henderson's winner's single for the fifth season of The X Factor, if he had won the show. However, Henderson finished in second place. On 1 November 2013, it was announced that Henderson signed a recording contract with Sony Music Australia, and "Borrow My Heart" was released digitally as his debut single later that day. A CD single was released on 8 November 2013.

Chart performance
"Borrow My Heart" debuted at number one on the ARIA Singles Chart on 11 November 2013. It was certified two times platinum by the Australian Recording Industry Association for selling over 140,000 copies.

Live performances
Henderson performed "Borrow My Heart" live for the first time during The X Factor grand final performance show on 27 October 2013.

Track listing
CD / digital download
 "Borrow My Heart" – 3:32

Personnel
Vocals – Taylor Henderson
Songwriting – Alex Hope, Hayley Warner, Louis Schoorl
Production – Louis Schoorl
Mixing engineer – Louis Schoorl

Source:

Charts

Weekly charts

Year-end charts

Certification

Release history

See also
List of number-one singles of 2013 (Australia)

References

2013 songs
2013 debut singles
Taylor Henderson songs
Songs written by Alex Hope (songwriter)
Songs written by Hayley Warner
Songs written by Louis Schoorl
Sony Music Australia singles
Number-one singles in Australia